The Interrogation may refer to:
 The Interrogation (film), 2008 film by Jörn Donner
 The Interrogation (novel), 1963 novel by J. M. G. Le Clézio
 "The Interrogation" (Dragnet), episode of Dragnet